The 1964 PRL symmetry breaking papers were written by three teams who proposed related but different approaches to explain how mass could arise in local gauge theories. These three papers were written by: Robert Brout and François Englert; Peter Higgs; and Gerald Guralnik, C. Richard Hagen, and Tom Kibble (GHK). They are credited with the theory of the Higgs mechanism and the prediction of the Higgs field and Higgs boson. Together, these provide a theoretical means by which Goldstone's theorem (a problematic limitation affecting early modern particle physics theories) can be avoided. They show how gauge bosons can acquire non-zero masses as a result of spontaneous symmetry breaking within gauge invariant models of the universe. 

As such, these form the key element of the electroweak theory that forms part of the Standard Model of particle physics, and of many models, such as the Grand Unified Theory, that go beyond it. The papers that introduce this mechanism were published in Physical Review Letters (PRL) and were each recognized as milestone papers by PRLs 50th anniversary celebration. All of the six physicists were awarded the 2010 J. J. Sakurai Prize for Theoretical Particle Physics for this work, and in 2013 Englert and Higgs received the Nobel Prize in Physics.

Introduction 
A gauge theory of elementary particles is a very attractive potential framework for constructing the ultimate theory. Such a theory has the very desirable property of being potentially renormalizable—shorthand for saying that all calculational infinities encountered can be consistently absorbed into a few parameters of the theory. However, as soon as one gives mass to the gauge fields, renormalizability is lost, and the theory rendered useless. Spontaneous symmetry breaking is a promising mechanism, which could be used to give mass to the vector gauge particles. A significant difficulty which one encounters, however, is Goldstone's theorem, which states that in any quantum field theory which has a spontaneously broken symmetry there must occur a zero-mass particle. So the problem arises—how can one break a symmetry and at the same time not introduce unwanted zero-mass particles. The resolution of this dilemma lies in the observation that in the case of gauge theories, the Goldstone theorem can be avoided by working in the so-called radiation gauge. This is because the proof of Goldstone's theorem requires manifest Lorentz covariance, a property not possessed by the radiation gauge.

History 

Particle physicists study matter made from fundamental particles whose interactions are mediated by exchange particles known as force carriers. At the beginning of the 1960s a number of these particles had been discovered or proposed, along with theories suggesting how they relate to each other, some of which had already been reformulated as field theories in which the objects of study are not particles and forces, but quantum fields and their symmetries. However, attempts to unify known fundamental forces such as the electromagnetic force and the weak nuclear force were known to be incomplete. One known omission was that gauge invariant approaches, including non-abelian models such as Yang–Mills theory (1954), which held great promise for unified theories, also seemed to predict known massive particles as massless. Goldstone's theorem, relating to continuous symmetries within some theories, also appeared to rule out many obvious solutions, since it appeared to show that zero-mass particles would have to also exist that were "simply not seen". According to Gerald Guralnik, physicists had "no understanding" how these problems could be overcome in 1964. In 2014, Guralnik and Carl Hagen wrote a paper that contended that even after 50 years there is still widespread misunderstanding, by physicists and the Nobel Committee, of the Goldstone boson role. This paper, published in Modern Physics Letters A, turned out to be Guralnik's last published work.

Particle physicist and mathematician Peter Woit summarised the state of research at the time:
 "Yang and Mills work on non-abelian gauge theory had one huge problem: in perturbation theory it has massless particles which don't correspond to anything we see. One way of getting rid of this problem is now fairly well-understood, the phenomenon of confinement realized in QCD, where the strong interactions get rid of the massless "gluon" states at long distances. By the very early sixties, people had begun to understand another source of massless particles: spontaneous symmetry breaking of a continuous symmetry. What Philip Anderson realized and worked out in the summer of 1962 was that, when you have both gauge symmetry and spontaneous symmetry breaking, the Nambu–Goldstone massless mode can combine with the massless gauge field modes to produce a physical massive vector field. This is what happens in superconductivity, a subject about which Anderson was (and is) one of the leading experts." [text condensed] 

The Higgs mechanism is a process by which vector bosons can get rest mass without explicitly breaking gauge invariance, as a byproduct of spontaneous symmetry breaking. The mathematical theory behind spontaneous symmetry breaking was initially conceived and published within particle physics by Yoichiro Nambu in 1960, the concept that such a mechanism could offer a possible solution for the "mass problem" was originally suggested in 1962 by Philip Anderson, and Abraham Klein and Benjamin Lee showed in March 1964 that Goldstone's theorem could be avoided this way in at least some non-relativistic cases and speculated it might be possible in truly relativistic cases.

These approaches were quickly developed into a full relativistic model, independently and almost simultaneously, by three groups of physicists: by François Englert and Robert Brout in August 1964; by Peter Higgs in October 1964; and by Gerald Guralnik, Carl Hagen, and Tom Kibble (GHK) in November 1964. Higgs also wrote a response published in September 1964 to an objection by Gilbert, which showed that if calculating within the radiation gauge, Goldstone's theorem and Gilbert's objection would become inapplicable. (Higgs later described Gilbert's objection as prompting his own paper.) Properties of the model were further considered by Guralnik in 1965, by Higgs in 1966, by Kibble in 1967, and further by GHK in 1967. The original three 1964 papers showed that when a gauge theory is combined with an additional field that spontaneously breaks the symmetry, the gauge bosons can consistently acquire a finite mass. In 1967, Steven Weinberg and Abdus Salam independently showed how a Higgs mechanism could be used to break the electroweak symmetry of Sheldon Glashow's unified model for the weak and electromagnetic interactions (itself an extension of work by Schwinger), forming what became the Standard Model of particle physics. Weinberg was the first to observe that this would also provide mass terms for the fermions. 

However, the seminal papers on spontaneous breaking of gauge symmetries were at first largely ignored, because it was widely believed that the (non-Abelian gauge) theories in question were a dead-end, and in particular that they could not be renormalised. In 1971–1972, Martinus Veltman and Gerard 't Hooft proved renormalisation of Yang–Mills was possible in two papers covering massless, and then massive, fields. Their contribution, and others' work on the renormalization group, was eventually "enormously profound and influential", but even with all key elements of the eventual theory published there was still almost no wider interest. For example, Sidney Coleman found in a study that "essentially no-one paid any attention" to Weinberg's paper prior to 1971 – now the most cited in particle physics – and even in 1970 according to Politzer, Glashow's teaching of the weak interaction contained no mention of Weinberg's, Salam's, or Glashow's own work. In practice, Politzer states, almost everyone learned of the theory due to physicist Benjamin Lee, who combined the work of Veltman and 't Hooft with insights by others, and popularised the completed theory. In this way, from 1971, interest and acceptance "exploded"  and the ideas were quickly absorbed in the mainstream.

The significance of requiring manifest covariance 
Most students who have taken a course in electromagnetism have encountered the Coulomb potential. It basically states that two charged particles attract or repel each other by a force which varies according to the inverse square of their separation. This is fairly unambiguous for particles at rest, but if one or the other is following an arbitrary trajectory the question arises whether one should compute the force using the instantaneous positions of the particles or the so-called retarded positions. The latter recognizes that information cannot propagate instantaneously, rather it propagates at the speed of light. However, the radiation gauge says that one uses the instantaneous positions of the particles, but doesn't violate causality because there are compensating terms in the force equation. In contrast, the Lorenz gauge imposes manifest covariance (and thus causality) at all stages of a calculation. Predictions of observable quantities are identical in the two gauges, but the radiation gauge formulation of quantum field theory avoids Goldstone's theorem.

Summary and impact of the PRL papers 
The three papers written in 1964 were each recognised as milestone papers during Physical Review Letters 50th anniversary celebration. Their six authors were also awarded the 2010 J. J. Sakurai Prize for Theoretical Particle Physics for this work. (A controversy also arose the same year, because in the event of a Nobel Prize only up to three scientists could be recognised, with six being credited for the papers. ) Two of the three PRL papers (by Higgs and by GHK) contained equations for the hypothetical field that eventually would become known as the Higgs field and its hypothetical quantum, the Higgs boson. Higgs's subsequent 1966 paper showed the decay mechanism of the boson; only a massive boson can decay and the decays can prove the mechanism.

Each of these papers is unique and demonstrates different approaches to showing how mass arise in gauge particles. Over the years, the differences between these papers are no longer widely understood, due to the passage of time and acceptance of end-results by the particle physics community. A study of citation indices is interesting—more than 40 years after the 1964 publication in Physical Review Letters there is little noticeable pattern of preference among them, with the vast majority of researchers in the field mentioning all three milestone papers.

In the paper by Higgs the boson is massive, and in a closing sentence Higgs writes that "an essential feature" of the theory "is the prediction of incomplete multiplets of scalar and vector bosons". (Frank Close comments that 1960s gauge theorists were focused on the problem of massless vector bosons, and the implied existence of a massive scalar boson was not seen as important; only Higgs directly addressed it.) In the paper by GHK the boson is massless and decoupled from the massive states. In reviews dated 2009 and 2011, Guralnik states that in the GHK model the boson is massless only in a lowest-order approximation, but it is not subject to any constraint and acquires mass at higher orders, and adds that the GHK paper was the only one to show that there are no massless Goldstone bosons in the model and to give a complete analysis of the general Higgs mechanism. All three reached similar conclusions, despite their very different approaches: Higgs' paper essentially used classical techniques, Englert and Brout's involved calculating vacuum polarization in perturbation theory around an assumed symmetry-breaking vacuum state, and GHK used operator formalism and conservation laws to explore in depth the ways in which Goldstone's theorem explicitly fails.

In addition to explaining how mass is acquired by vector bosons, the Higgs mechanism also predicts the ratio between the W boson and Z boson masses as well as their couplings with each other and with the Standard Model quarks and leptons. Subsequently, many of these predictions have been verified by precise measurements performed at the LEP and the SLC colliders, thus overwhelmingly confirming that some kind of Higgs mechanism does take place in nature, but the exact manner by which it happens has not yet been discovered. The results of searching for the Higgs boson are expected to provide evidence about how this is realized in nature.

Consequences of the papers 
The resulting electroweak theory and Standard Model have correctly predicted (among other discoveries) weak neutral currents, three bosons, the top and charm quarks, and with great precision, the mass and other properties of some of these. Many of those involved eventually won Nobel Prizes or other renowned awards. A 1974 paper in Reviews of Modern Physics commented that "while no one doubted the [mathematical] correctness of these arguments, no one quite believed that nature was diabolically clever enough to take advantage of them". By 1986 and again in the 1990s it became possible to write that understanding and proving the Higgs sector of the Standard Model was "the central problem today in particle physics."

See also

Notes

References

Further reading

External links

The Hunt for the Higgs at Tevatron
CERN Courier Letter from GHK – December 2008 
In CERN Courier, Steven Weinberg reflects on spontaneous symmetry breaking
Blog Not Even Wrong, Review of Massive by Ian Sample
Blog Not Even Wrong, Anderson-Higgs Mechanism
Ian Sample on Controversy and Nobel Reform 

PRL symmetry breaking papers
Physics papers
Works originally published in American magazines
1964 documents
Works originally published in science and technology magazines
Standard Model